Marián Ľalík (born 7 February 1972) is a Slovak retired football midfielder who played professionally in Slovakia, Czech Republic, Greece, Turkey and Cyprus.

Playing career

Club career
Ľalík began his playing career in Slovakia. He moved to Sparta Prague, but would only play in one Gambrinus liga match for the club. He returned to Slovakia where he enjoyed success with AŠK Inter Bratislava, scoring nine goals and winning the Slovak Superliga and Slovak Cup double during the 1999–00 season.

Ľalík moved abroad again when he signed a one-year contract with Greek Super League club Panionios F.C. in January 2002. He played in 31 league matches for Panionios before leaving during the 2002–03 season winter break. He joined Adanaspor in January 2003, and played in 45 Super Lig matches during his 1.5 year spell with the club.

References

External links
Guardian's Stats Centre

1972 births
Living people
Slovak footballers
Partizán Bardejov players
FK Dukla Banská Bystrica players
FC Lokomotíva Košice players
FC VSS Košice players
AC Sparta Prague players
FK Inter Bratislava players
Panionios F.C. players
Niki Volos F.C. players
Adanaspor footballers
Aris Limassol FC players
Slovak Super Liga players
Expatriate footballers in the Czech Republic
Expatriate footballers in Greece
Expatriate footballers in Cyprus

Association football midfielders